Iryna Viktorivna Hlavnyk (born 11 May 1996 in Kyiv) is a Ukrainian swimmer. She competed in the 4 × 200 metre freestyle relay event at the 2012 Summer Olympics.

In 2014, she represented Ukraine at the 2014 Summer Youth Olympics held in Nanjing, China.

References

1996 births
Living people
Sportspeople from Kyiv
Ukrainian female backstroke swimmers
Ukrainian female medley swimmers
Olympic swimmers of Ukraine
Swimmers at the 2012 Summer Olympics
Swimmers at the 2014 Summer Youth Olympics
Ukrainian female freestyle swimmers
21st-century Ukrainian women